The Kawasaki Brave Thunders are a Japanese professional basketball team located in Kanagawa, Japan. The team currently competes in the B.League.

The team was the 2016 Champion of the now dissolved Japanese National Basketball League.

Several of its players have played for a diverse set of international senior national teams.

Roster

Notable players

To appear in this section a player must have either:
- Set a club record or won an individual award as a professional player.
- Played at least one official international match for his senior national team.

Arenas
Todoroki Arena
Tokkei Security Hiratsuka General Gymnasium

Practice facilities

They practice at the Toshiba Komukai Gymnasium in Saiwai-ku, Kawasaki.

References

External links

 
 Presentation at Asia-basket.com
 FIBA Profile

 
Basketball teams in Japan
Basketball teams established in 1950
Sports teams in Kanagawa Prefecture
1950 establishments in Japan